Holk is a hamlet in the Dutch province of Gelderland. It is a part of the municipality of Nijkerk, and lies about 7 km northeast of Amersfoort.

It was first mentioned around 1325 as Hollic, and means "low lying neighbourhood". Holk is not a statistical entity, and the postal authorities have placed it under Nijkerk. In 1840, it was home to 204 people. Since 2012, it has place name signs.

References

Populated places in Gelderland
Nijkerk